Sir George Williams University was a university in Montreal, Quebec, Canada. It merged with Loyola College to create Concordia University on August 24, 1974.

History

In 1851, the first YMCA in North America was established on Sainte-Hélène Street in Old Montreal. Beginning in 1873, the YMCA offered evening classes to allow working people in the English-speaking community to pursue their education while working during the day. Sixty years later, the Montreal YMCA relocated to its current location on Stanley Street in Downtown Montreal.

In 1926, the education program at the YMCA was re-organized as Sir George Williams College, named after George Williams, founder of the original YMCA in London, upon which the Montreal YMCA was based. In 1934, Sir George Williams College offered the first undergraduate credit course in adult education in Canada.

Sir George Williams College received its university charter from the provincial government in 1948, though it remained the education arm of the Montreal YMCA. Sir George Williams expanded into its first standalone building, the Norris Building, in 1956. In 1959, the college requested that the Quebec legislature amend its university charter, changing its name to Sir George Williams University. It established a Centre for Human Relations and Community Studies in 1963. Sir George Williams continued to hold classes in the YMCA building until the construction of the Henry F. Hall Building in 1966.

Following several years of discussions and planning, Sir George Williams University merged with Loyola College to create Concordia University in 1974. Concordia provided students with representative student organizations and greater power over administrative decisions at the university.

Sir George Williams Computer Centre Incident

The university gained international attention in 1969, when a group of Black students occupied the Henry F. Hall Building's 9th floor computer lab to protest alleged racism by the university.  This protest was documented in the 2015 film The Ninth Floor by director Mina Shum.

Sir George Williams Georgians
The Sir George Williams Georgians were the Canadian Interuniversity Athletics Union teams that represented Sir George Williams University.

Shortly after Sir George Williams merged with Loyola College to create Concordia University in 1974, the Georgians and the Loyola Warriors were replaced by the Concordia Stingers.

Principals

Alumni
Bob Berry (born 1943), NHL player
Gundega Cenne (1933-2009), artist
John Alton Collins (1917–2007), political cartoonist
Anne Cools (born 1943), Canadian Senator and social worker
Robert Dean (1927-2021), Canadian politician 
Rosie Douglas (1941-2000), Prime Minister of Dominica
Stuart McLean (1948-2017), author, storyteller, Canadian radio broadcaster
E. Annie Proulx (born 1935), novelist, short story writer, journalist
Nachum Eliezer Rabinovitch, rabbi and author (1928-2020)
Mordecai Richler (1931-2001), author 
Bernie Wolfe (born 1951), NHL player

References

 
Concordia University
Defunct universities and colleges in Canada
English-language universities and colleges in Quebec
Educational institutions established in 1926
Educational institutions disestablished in 1974
1926 establishments in Quebec
1974 disestablishments in Quebec
Universities and colleges founded by the YMCA